Air Staff (FS) is the staff of the Chief of the Swedish Air Force. It was officially established in 1936 as a result of the Defence Act of 1936 and would handle matters of a general nature. The Air Staff's duties included, among other things to assist the Chief of the Air Force with leadership of the Air Force's mobilization, training, tactics, organization, equipment and personnel to the extent that such activity was not directly related to operational activities, which was then handled by the Defence Staff. In 1994, the Swedish Armed Forces Headquarters took over the Air Staff's duties. In 2019, the Air Force Staff was re-established, now located in Uppsala Garrison.

History

When the position of the Chief of the Air Force was created in 1925 it had a number of officers at its disposal. The Chief of the Air Force's staff was organized in 1933 in three departments: I (organization, air forces use), II (training and personnel matters) and III (intelligence about foreign air forces, etc.). The Air Staff was organized om 1 July 1936 with the following organizations: Office (1936–1964), Organization Department (1936–), Education Department (1936–), Operation Department (1936–), Operation Department (1936–1964), Aviation Department (1936–1938) and the Intelligence Department (from 1936 to 1937, when its duties were transferred to the Defence Staff). In 1937 a press officer was added, in 1942 a Press Section, in 1957 a Press Detail and the 1964 a Press Department.

In 1942, a Flight Safety and Accident Department (1942–1964) was added, then transferred to the Inspector of Flight Security (Inspektören för flygsäkerhetstjänsten), and a Signal and Weather Department (1942–1944). The latter was divided in 1944 into a Signal Department (1944–1957) and a Weather Department (1944–) for the Armed Forces a joint weather center. In 1945 a Human Resources Department (1945) was added, and in 1948 a Cash Department (1948–1957). The Signal Department was in 1957 renamed the Telecom Department (1957–1964). The same year a Planning Department (1957–) and an Intelligence Department was added.

In July 1964 the Air Staff was reorganized and sections were introduced. Subordinate to the Chief was the Chief Head Office (1964–1975), the Planning Department and the Weather Department (in 1968 transferred to the Inspector of the Weather Service). Section 1 consisted of the Central Department, Signal Communications Department, Traffic Department and the Intelligence Department (from circa 1975 the Intelligence Department (from circa 1975 the Intelligence and Security Department). Section II consisted of the Organizational Department, Education Department, Personnel Department and the Press Department (from 1973 the Information Department) and from 1968 by an ADB (EDP) Department and from 1976 of the Land (Warfare) Inspection (1976–).

The next major reorganization was in July 1981. The Air Staff was from now on called the Chief of the Air Force (Chefen för flygvapnet, CFV). After this reorganization the Air Staff consisted of the Chief, Planning Section FS1, System Section FS2, Human Resources Section FS3 and Education Section FS4, Organic Unit Inspection, Flight Safety Section, Weather Service Management and Administration Department. The Air Staff has also included other units: the Surgeon-in-Chief of the Swedish Air Force with predecessors (1931–1969), Inspector of the Flying Safety Service (flygsäkerhetsinspektören) (1949–), Inspection of Air Surveillance (1948–1964), Inspection for Technical Services (1948–1960), Land Warfare Inspection (1956–1964), the Inspection of Base Service (1960–1964), the Inspection of the Air Force's Volunteer Activities (1961–1964), the Air Force Personnel Delegation (1959–1964), the System Inspector (1964–1981), the Inspector of Weather Service (1968–1981) and the Organic Unit Inspection (1981–).

In March 1976, the Air Staff had about 370 employees. Because of the reorganization in 1981, the Air Staff's workforce was decline from approximately 315 to 225. The last management meeting of the Air Staff occurred on 26 March 1993. The Air Staff was in connection with the Swedish Armed Forces restructuring on 1 July 1994 amalgamated into the Swedish Armed Forces Headquarters as the Air Force Command.

Location
The main part of the Air Staff was from 1943 to 1981 located in the building Tre Vapen at Banérgatan 62-64 and at six other places in the Stockholm area. In 1981, it moved to the building Bastionen at Lidingövägen 24 in Stockholm.

The location of the new Air Staff was proposed by the Swedish Armed Forces to be established in Uppsala garrison. There the staff will move in to three larger white buildings in the southern part of the area, which were originally erected in the 1940s for the Royal Swedish Air Force College (Flygkadettskolan, F 20). There were two wings with cadet dwellings and between them a building with lecture halls and administrative premises. Upstairs there was a hall which was also used for parties. A few hundred meters north of the school house lay the cadet mess, a low white building.

Heraldry
The coat of arms of the Air Staff was used from 1937 and 1994. It was later used by the Air Force Command 1994–1997, Air Force Tactical Center 1997–1998, Air Force Center 1998–2000 and the Air Force Tactical Command 2000–2018. Blazon: "Azure, a winged two-bladed propeller or".

Chiefs of the Air Staff

List of Chiefs of the Air Staff:

1936–1942: Bengt Nordenskiöld
1942–1947: Axel Ljungdahl
1947–1957: Gustaf Adolf Westring
1957–1960: Lennart Peyron
1960–1964: Stig Norén
1964–1966: Gösta Odqvist
1966–1970: Claës-Henrik Nordenskiöld
1970–1973: Dick Stenberg
1973–1978: Hans Neij
1978–1980: Erik Nygren
1980–1984: Evert Båge
1984–1987: Bengt Lönnbom
1987–1990: Bert Stenfeldt
1990–1994: Bernt Östh
1993–1994: Kjell Nilsson (acting)
2019–2019: Anders Persson
2019–2020: Anders Jönsson
2020–2024: Dennis Hedström

Vice Chiefs of the Air Staff
1943–1948: Karl Silfverberg
1948–1951: Torsten Rapp
1951–1953: Greger Falk
1953–1959: Stig Möller
1959–1961: Gösta Odqvist
1961–1966: Nils Personne

Names, designations and locations

Footnotes

References

Notes

Print

Further reading

Staff (military)
Military units and formations of the Swedish Air Force
Military units and formations established in 1936
Military units and formations disestablished in 1994
Military units and formations established in 2019
1936 establishments in Sweden
1994 disestablishments in Sweden
2019 establishments in Sweden
Stockholm Garrison
Uppsala Garrison